John Hilton Edwards (26 March 1928 – 11 October 2007) was a British medical geneticist. Edwards reported the first description of a syndrome of multiple congenital malformations associated the presence of an extra chromosome. The extra chromosome belonged to the E group of chromosomes which consisted of chromosomes 16, 17 and 18.  The condition is now known as Edwards syndrome or trisomy 18 syndrome.

In 1979, Edwards was elected to fellowship of the Royal Society. He was a Fellow of Keble College, Oxford, and Professor of Genetics at Oxford from 1979 to 1995.

He was the son of the surgeon Harold C. Edwards. His brother is the geneticist and statistician A.W.F. Edwards. Early in his career, he worked under Lancelot Hogben, and was sometimes distinguished from the brother as "Hogben's Edwards".

References

External links

Further information 
 John Hilton Edwards (a short biography).

Obituaries 
 Professor John Edwards obituary, The Independent
 BMJ obituary
 Nature Genetics obituary

1928 births
2007 deaths
British geneticists
Medical geneticists
Fellows of the Royal Society
People educated at Uppingham School
Academics of the University of Birmingham
Professors of Genetics (University of Oxford)
Fellows of Keble College, Oxford